"Never Never Love" is a 1996 song by British soul and pop band Simply Red. Written by frontman Mick Hucknall, it was featured on the album Life and reached number 18 on the UK chart when released in February 1996. The song additionally peaked at number 7 in Hungary and number 26 in Iceland. On the Eurochart Hot 100, it reached number 93 in March 1996. The music video for "Never Never Love" featured British actresses Stephanie Beacham, Rula Lenska and Billie Whitelaw.

Critical reception
Larry Flick from Billboard wrote that Simply Red "continues to be one of the more reliable sources for old-school soul that is more than a retread of familiar ideas." He explained that "as evident on this breezy number" Hucknall "aims to deconstruct the ideas triggered by his favorite old records with fresh new ones. Topped by winding organ lines and fuzzy funk guitar licks, the song mines a groove that snugly fits between jeep youth and classic disco—with just a touch of jazz to keep you alert." Music & Media called it a "mid-tempo soulful tune". Newcastle Journal described it as a "beautiful slow ballad". Pop Rescue noted that "this is a nice warm, chilled out track, complete with 'la la la-la la' vocal intro. Mick's vocals suit the bass and beats on this track." David Gaskey from The Rice Thresher called it "reggae", which "poses the powerful question, "So now we've got our independence, what are we gonna do with it?"".

Music Video
The music video featured actresses Billie Whitelaw and Stephanie Beacham.

Track listings
EW029CD1
 Never Never Love (7-inch Radio Mix) (4:05)
 Fairground (Live) (5:45)
 You Make Me Believe (Merv's Amazon Mix) (4:47)
 Groovy Situation (Live) (4:57)

EW029CD2
 Never Never Love (Too Precious 7-inch Mix) (4:17)
 Never Never Love (DJ Muggs Master Mix) (3:51)
 Never Never Love (DJ Muggs Instrumental Mix) (3:50)
 Never Never Love (Grooving With the Angels Mix) (4:38)
 Never Never Love (US R & B Mix) (4:18)

EW029C cassette
 Never Never Love (Too Precious 7-inch Mix) (4:05)
 Never Never Love (7-inch Radio Edit) (4:07)

Charts

References

1995 songs
1996 singles
East West Records singles
Simply Red songs
Songs written by Mick Hucknall